Batucada is a substyle of samba and refers to a percussive style, usually performed by an ensemble, known as a bateria. Batucada is characterized by its repetitive style and fast pace. As is Samba, the Batucada is a Brazilian musical expression with African roots.

Overview/Instruments
The wide variety of instruments used in a batucada include:
Repinique, a high-pitched tom-tom like drum played with a single stick (or two long sticks) and the hand. Traditionally the leader of the ensemble uses the repinique (also referred to as 'repique') to direct and solo.
Surdo, a large drum with an average size of 50 cm in diameter. It provides the downbeat, the bass downbeat of the rhythm. When only one surdo is playing, it accentuates the 2nd and 4th beat of every measure. When a second surdo is playing, it is tuned slightly higher and is played accentuating the first and third beats of the measure. A third surdo de terceira or Surdo-mor syncopates in between the beats.
Tamborim, a small drum usually played with a stick or a multi-pronged plastic beater.
Bells (agogô).
Chocalho (Ganzá, Rocar, and shakers of various types and materials).
Cuica, a single headed drum with a stick mounted inside the drum body, perpendicular to the head. The instrument is played by rubbing a damp cloth along the length of this stick, while pressing the head of the drum with a finger or thumb. The harder to the stick the finger is pressed, the higher the pitch of the sound is produced. The cuica creates a unique sound, which can sometimes sound like a human voice.
Timbal, a long cone-like drum that is used to produce both high & low tones in the ensemble. It is usually played with hands and creates a similar timbre as the West African Djembé. 
Pandeiro, similar to a tambourine and played sometimes elaborately with the hand. Unlike the tambourine, the pandeiro can be tuned.
Reco-reco (known in Spanish as the güiro), a usually hollow wooden instrument with a ridged exterior surface that is scraped with a stick.
Apito, a small plastic, metal or wooden whistle.

Songs    
 Batucada Suite performed by blue-eyed soul singer Teena Marie. Written by Teena Marie from the Album Emerald City.
 The Obvious Child from Paul Simon's album The Rhythm of the Saints is an example of the sound of the samba-Afro style, exemplified by the Bahian samba reggae group Olodum.
 Celebration Suite performed by Airto, written by Hugo Fattoruso.
 Portela performed by Pai Benê, Queimou O Pé.
 Batucada Surgiu by Marcos Valle, Sérgio Mendes's cover of which appeared on Look around.
 Samba-Afro style also shown on "El Matador" from the Argentine band Los Fabulosos Cadillacs, a rhythm inspired by Samba-reggae from Bahia, Brazil.
 Kiss of Life by British band Friendly Fires also features a batucada instrumentation in the background playing a funk beat.

Notable musicians
Ara Ketu
Badauê
Ilê Aiyê
Malê Debalê
Monobloco
Muzenza
Olodum
Swing do Pelo
Timbalada

See also
Latin music
Samba reggae
Batuque, a Cape Verdean genre with a similar etymology

References

External links

Samba